The Yad Yisroel is a non-profit 501(c)(3) organization founded by the Stoliner rebbe in 1990 to work with Jews from the former Soviet Union. It has established community projects and schools in Kyiv, Lviv, Minsk, Pinsk and Khmelnytski.

History
Yad Yisroel is a registered non-profit organization in the United States, United Kingdom, Israel and the former Soviet Union.

In April 1992, as an emissary of Stolin, Rabbi Yochonon Berman travelled to Pinsk to conduct a seder.

In 2000, at Berman's suggestion, Yad Yisroel sent Moshe Fhima, who had been working for Yad Yisroel in Kyiv at the Jewish Boarding School, to Pinsk.

Yad Yisroel has established two boarding schools, a yeshiva, a kosher store, a mikveh, and Chesed aid for the elderly in Pinsk.

Education
The schools, with dormitories on campus, combine Jewish studies and a general secular high school curriculum.

Beis Aharon Boys' School

Limudei Kodesh 
Classes cover all levels from introductory level Judaism up to Mishna and Gemara. Full-time counsellors, a doctor and a psychologist are on staff.

Beis Aharon Bielski Campus 

The 5070 square meter campus includes an educational wing, a residence and an orphanage, an auditorium, a kindergarten, a recreational facility, and a kitchen and dining hall. It was inaugurated on Tuesday, October 28, 2014.

Beis Aharon Girls' School
There are Beis Aharon Girls Schools in England, USA, Canada, Belarus and Israel.

Summer Camps
Yad Yisroel in Pinsk has organized educational summer camps in Belarus.

Timeline

1990 

 A Hebrew Day School is established in Kyiv, eventually having a peak enrolment of 600 students. In addition, yearly summer camps are created - the critical period to reach children and their parents for future scholastic enrolment.
 A shechita butchery is also established in Kyiv - distribution of kosher meat throughout the FSU.
 Establishment of Magen Avot, the social welfare program serving 10,000 homebound and elderly in 52 cities of the Ukraine, subsequently offered to the JDC. The program is still very active.

1991 

 Yad Yisroel shaliach Rabbi Yitzchok Wolpin visits Minsk to discuss revival of the Jewish community in the city.
 A mikveh is built in Lviv, Ukraine.

1992 

 Rabbi Yochonon Berman arrives in Pinsk.

1993 

 Sunday schools are established in various smaller cities.

1994 

 Hebrew Day School in Lviv is established, with 140 students.

1995 

 A Jewish Sunday school is established in Khmelnytskyi.
 Rabbi Yochonon Berman succeeds in getting back the original Karlin synagogue from the local officials in Pinsk.

1996 

 A new mikveh is built in Kyiv. A Jewish boarding school for homeless children and teenagers is also founded in Kyiv.

2000 

 The Jewish School and Boarding School for boys is founded in Pinsk by Rabbi Moshe Fhima.

2001 

 The Jewish School and Boarding School for girls is founded in Pinsk.

2003 

 The girls' school campus in Pinsk is completed.
 Renovations of the Beis Aharon Shul in Pinsk are completed.

2004 

 A plot of land for the boys' school campus in Pinsk is purchased.

2005 

 The restoration of the Reb Aharon Synagogue in Pinsk is completed.

2006 

 Plans to build a new boys' school campus are completed.
 Yeshivas Pe'er Yisroel is established.

2007 

 The synagogue of Reb Aharon HaGadol is purchased and prepared for refurbishment.
 A building is purchased to house bochur dormitories.

2008 

 Construction begun on boys' school campus.
 Renovations begin on the bochur dormitory building.

2011 

 A record number of children attend Yad Yisroel Camp.

2014 

 Grand opening of Beis Aharon Bielski School in Pinsk.

2015 

 Record number of students in Yeshiva High School in Pinsk.
 The Bielski Campsite is inaugurated.

References

Jewish organizations based in Russia